Washington Center is an unincorporated town in Washington Township, Whitley County, in the U.S. state of Indiana.

History
A post office was established at Washington Center in 1855, and remained in operation until it was discontinued in 1874.

Geography

References

Unincorporated communities in Whitley County, Indiana
Unincorporated communities in Indiana